This is a list of lighthouses in Vietnam, sorted by Region.

Lighthouses

Northwest Region (Tây Bắc Bộ)

Red River Delta (Đồng Bằng Sông Hồng)

North Central Coast (Bắc Trung Bộ)

South Central Coast (Nam Trung Bộ)

South Central Coast (Duyên hải Nam Trung Bộ)

Spratly Islands (Quần đảo Trường Sa)

See also
 Lists of lighthouses and lightvessels

References

External links

 

Vietnam
Lighthouses
Lighthouses